Zincville is a ghost town in Ottawa County, Oklahoma, United States.

It is located between Picher and Hockerville, near the Kansas-Oklahoma border.

References

Ghost towns in Oklahoma